The Miami Valley Career Technology Center (MVCTC) is a public career technology school in Englewood, Ohio.  It serves five southwestern Ohio counties (Montgomery, Warren, Preble, Darke, and Miami). Prior to 1994 it was known as the Montgomery County Joint Vocational School.

Students from 27 partner high schools attend classes daily in one of 40 career programs.  Students from districts outside the 27 participating schools may attend MVCTC by applying for admission and then by adhering to open enrollment guidelines.

The high school division is approved and accredited by the Ohio Department of Education and North Central Association of Colleges and Schools as a two-year public career technical school. The division offers secondary preparation with in-school and cooperative education programs.

High school curriculum

Graduation and diploma 
Students earn a Career Passport from MVCTC and graduate from their partner school district.  Upon completion of a career program, a student must have sufficient grades and attendance, and demonstrate competencies in their career program.  A student will receive a portfolio showing various achievements and competencies they have earned over their academic career at MVCTC.

Career and technical student organizations 

Students are also encouraged to participate in student organizations such as HOSA, FCCLA, SkillsUSA, Business Professionals of America (BPA), and Future Farmers of America. These groups organize and sponsor events and contests related to the student's career choice.  Students who excel in their skill sets are recognized at national levels in these events.

Satellite programs 
MVCTC works with partner school districts to offer 23 satellite programs and serve over 4,000 students each year.

Project SEARCH is a business-led, one-year school-to-work program. Total workplace immersion facilitates a seamless combination of classroom instruction, career exploration, and hands-on training through worksite rotations. The program is intended for “Super Seniors”.  Students interested must have met all high school credits, have deferred their diploma, be between the ages of 18–21, and want to work. Project SEARCH-MVCTC at MVHS provides individualized job coaching services to each intern along with the guidance and support of a department mentor for a well-rounded training experience. This is a 9-month school year program with the outcome of successful community employment.  

MVCTC and Northmont City School Career Credit Lab (CCL) - MVCTC and Northmont City School have partnered to create another tremendous opportunity for students at Northmont High School.  The Career Credit Lab (CCL) combines a work-based learning component along with related academics to give students the opportunity to gain valuable employability skills and job-site experiences while earning credits towards high school graduation.  Included in the CCL is also a credit lab for students that may need intervention with credit recovery to further enhance their opportunities to stay on track for graduation.  

MVCTC and Northmont City School Senior Only Credential Programs - Senior students at Northmont have the opportunity to gain industry credentials that they will be able to use throughout their lifetime.  Credential opportunities are to either earn their State Tested Nursing Assistant (STNA) or certification in Robotics and Manufacturing from Yaskawa and FANUC. This opportunity is the first of its kind in the Miami Valley Region.

College opportunities 
MVCTC prepares students for college by providing opportunities to earn college credit and scholarship money. Several opportunities are offered to students meeting the established criteria for early college options:

College Credit Plus 
MVCTC students who qualify can earn college and high school credit from MVCTC College Credit Plus partners in several academic courses. These offerings include pre-calculus, calculus, English, communications, social studies, and statistics.

Tech Prep Programs 
Tech Prep students completing the high school requirements can graduate from high school with college credits posted on a Sinclair Community College transcript and earn Sinclair's Tech Prep Scholarship, enabling them to pursue and complete a wide variety of certificates and degree programs in preparation for industry-specific jobs and/or additional post-secondary education at four-year colleges and universities. (Some programs offer Tech Prep options with Clark State Community College.)

CTAG / Career-Technical Transfer Credit (CT)2 
Students who successfully complete specified technical programs are eligible to have technical credit transfer to public colleges and universities. This transfer of credit is described in Career Technical Assurance Guides (CTAG). CTAGs are advising tools that assist students moving from Ohio secondary and adult career-technical institutions to Ohio public institutions of higher education.

Apprenticeship
Apprenticeship opportunities at MVCTC allows students to work and earn a paycheck while learning skills and earning certifications.

College Partners 

 Clark State Community College

 Edison State Community College

 Sinclair Community College

Certifications 
Students attending MVCTC may have the opportunity to earn industry standard certifications in their career program. The Ohio Department of Education determines the point value for each certificate.

Adult education programs 
MVCTC Adult Education offers adult students full-time career programs, short-term courses, and education and training services such as GED, ASPIRE, and ESOL classes.  MVCTC is a full-service adult career technical education and occupation school, a University System of Ohio Technical Center under the Ohio Department of Higher Education (ODHE), and a member of the University System of Ohio Talent Development Network.

Adult Ed Short Term Courses
MVCTC Adult Education offers Short-Term Courses in Medical Programs, Public Safety, Robotics and Advanced Manufacturing, Service Programs, Trades and Machining, and Veterinary Assistant.

Adult Education Aspire 
Ohio's Aspire programs provide free services for individuals who need assistance acquiring the skills to be successful in post-secondary education and training, and employment. Local programs offer classes at flexible locations, and on different days and times to meet diverse needs. All students are required to attend orientation, where an assessment is given to help determine the individual's educational needs and goals.

References 

High schools in Montgomery County, Ohio
Public high schools in Ohio